The 1993 German motorcycle Grand Prix was the sixth round of the 1993 Grand Prix motorcycle racing season. It took place on 13 June 1993, at the Hockenheim circuit.

500 cc race report
Shinichi Itoh on pole, Wayne Rainey again on the 2nd row.

Àlex Crivillé to the front from Daryl Beattie, Schwantz, Mick Doohan and Rainey.

Doohan takes the lead; Rainey getting dropped. Serious accident for the Italian Corrado Catalano, he fell, was hit by his motorcycle and for some days was in a comatose.

Doohan has a mechanical problem and drops out; Shinichi Itoh passes Crivillé for 3rd, with Schwantz in 1st and Beattie in 2nd.

Into the last lap, Beattie is in front of Schwantz; Itoh twice comes alongside Schwantz and thwarts Schwantz’ attempts to brake-pass Beattie. Itoh becomes the first rider to pass 200 mph in a speed trap.

Schwantz seems happy with second because Rainey is so far behind, and is now 14 points behind Schwantz.

500 cc classification

250 cc classification

References

German motorcycle Grand Prix
German
Motorcycle Grand Prix